Below is the list of the 116th Maine Senate, which was sworn into office in December 1992 and left office in December 1994.

1 Raynold Theriault (R) of Fort Kent, Aroostook County
2 Leo Kieffer (R) of Caribou, Aroostook County
3 Margaret Ludwig (R) of Houlton, Aroostook County
4 Charlie Webster (R) of Farmington, Franklin County
5 Charles P. Pray (D) of Millinocket, Penobscot County 
6 Michael Pearson (D) of Enfield, Penobscot County
7 Vinton Cassidy (R) of Calais,  Washington County
8 M. Ida Luther (D) of Mexico, Oxford County
9 Alton Cianchette (D) of Pittsfield, Somerset County
10 John Baldacci (D) of Bangor, Penobscot County
11 John O'Dea (D) of Orono,  Penobscot County
12 Ruth Foster (R) of Ellsworth,  Hancock County
13 Harold Marden (R) of Albion, Kennebec County
14 Robert Gould (R) of Belfast, Waldo County
15 Dana Hanley (R) of South Paris, Oxford County
16 Georgette Berube (D) of Lewiston, Androscoggin County
17 Richard Carey (D) of Belgrade, Kennebec County
18 Dale McCormick (D) of Monmouth, Kennebec County
19 Beverly Bustin (D) of Hallowell, Kennebec County
20 Charles Begley (R) of Waldoboro, Lincoln County
21 Chellie Pingree (D) of North Haven, Knox County
22 John Cleveland (D) of Auburn, Androscoggin County
23 James R. Handy (D) of Lewiston, Androscoggin County
24 Pamela Cahill (R) of Woolwich, Sagadahoc County
25 Bonnie Titcomb (D) of Casco, Cumberland County
26 Phil Harriman (R) of Yarmouth, Cumberland County
27 Jeffrey Butland (R) of Cumberland, Cumberland County
28 Donald Esty, Jr. (D) of Westbrook, Cumberland County
29 Joseph Brannigan (D) of Portland, Cumberland County
30 Gerard P. Conley, Jr. (D) of Portland, Cumberland County
31 Charles E. Summers, Jr.  (R) of Scarborough, Cumberland County
32 Jane A. Amero (R) of Cape Elizabeth, Cumberland County
33 David L. Carpenter (R) of Sanford, York County
34 Dennis L. Dutremble (D) of Biddeford, York County
35 Mark W. Lawrence (R) of Kittery, York County

References

Maine legislative sessions
1990s in Maine
1992 in Maine
1993 in Maine
1994 in Maine